Kleven is a  long right tributary of the Seym in Russia and Ukraine. It drains a catchment area of 2660 km2 and has a gradient of 0.36 m/km.

Course
Kleven rises in the south-west of the Central Russian Upland in the south of the Russian Bryansk Oblast near the M3/E101 trunk road and initially flows south. After a few kilometers, it comes across the Ukrainian village of Sopych. From there it forms the border between the Ukrainian Sumy Oblast and the Russian Kursk Oblast over a longer stretch, changing its direction of flow mainly to the southwest, until it finally flows into the Seym at the southern edge of the village of Kamin in Sumy Oblast.

References

Rivers of Bryansk Oblast
Rivers of Kursk Oblast
Rivers of Sumy Oblast